"Someone to You" is a song by English musician Banners, released in June 2017 as the third single from Banners second extended play Empires on Fire and his second album Where the Shadow Ends. The song is a declaration of the willingness to fully commit to a relationship. The declaration is delivered in a spirited melody and is reinforced by gang backing vocals.

Though it did not chart at the time of its release, it later became a viral sleeper hit in 2020 after gaining popularity on the TikTok video sharing app.

Background and release
"Someone to You" was released in June 2017.

In 2020, it was used in a trailer for a TV show, in a movie, in a T-Mobile commercial and on TikTok. The song's success took Banners by surprise saying at first, he had no idea why the track was getting so many unexpected streams: "I try not to look at my Spotify numbers too much...but every now and then I was just checking it and it was like, 'This is getting more and more popular every week. So I went to the record label...and I was like, 'Can we find out what's going on, please?'"

In January 2021, he performed the song at Live with Kelly and Ryan.

Critical reception
Spill Magazine said called the song "magnetic and warm, capturing the simple pleasures of falling in love, while maintaining the thought-provoking choral components that define the Banners sound."

Mary Chang from There Goes the Fear said "The song is a wonderful foot-stomper, with an incessant, irrepressible beat, and lyrics that beg to be sung along to."

Track listings
 Digital single
 "Someone to You" – 3:39

 Digital single
 "Someone to You" (acoustic) – 3:03

 Digital single
 "Someone to You" (The DJ Mike D Mix) – 3:26

 Digital single
 "Someone to You" (The DJ Mike D Mix) – 3:26

 Digital single
 "Someone to You" – 3:39
 "Someone to You" (acoustic) – 3:34
 "Someone to You" (Philip George Mix) – 3:27
 "Someone to You" (Stripped) – 3:40
 "Someone to You" (The DJ Mike D Mix) – 3:26
 "Someone to You" (Pilton Remix) – 3:44

Charts

Weekly charts

Year-end charts

Certifications

References

2017 songs
2017 singles
Banners (musician) songs
Island Records singles
Songs written by Banners (musician)
Songs written by Koz (musician)
Songs written by Sam Hollander